Stingray Vibe is a Canadian English language discretionary specialty channel owned by Stingray Digital. The channel broadcasts hip-hop, rap, R&B, rhythmic pop and EDM/Dance music videos.

History
In November 2000, CHUM Limited was granted approval by the Canadian Radio-television and Telecommunications Commission (CRTC) to launch a channel named MuchVibe, described as "a national English-language Category 2 music video specialty television service dedicated to Urban music (HipHop, Rap, R&B, Soul and Reggae) and Urban music-related programming."

The channel launched on September 7, 2001 MuchVibe, fashioned after the former MuchMusic original program of the same name. The channel aired primarily music videos with a small selection of other programming including concerts and interviews. Select programs from MuchMusic were aired on a more frequent and longer basis on MuchVibe, including the rap/hip-hop programs Rap City and The DownLo, and the network's eponymous R&B block Vibe.

In July 2006, Bell Globemedia (later called CTVglobemedia) announced that it would purchase CHUM for an estimated $1.7 billion CAD; included in the sale was MuchVibe. The sale was subject to CRTC approval and was approved in June 2007, with the transaction completed on June 22, 2007.

While the channel, from its inception, had always been an ad-supported service, on August 31, 2009, commercial advertising was dropped from the music video portion of the channel's schedule. The only remaining commercials existed in programs such as concerts or other special programming.

On September 10, 2010, BCE (a minority shareholder in CTVglobemedia) announced that it planned to acquire 100% interest in CTVglobemedia for a total debt and equity transaction cost of $3.2 billion CAD. The deal  was approved by the CRTC on March 7, 2011 and closed on April 1 of that year, when CTVglobemedia was rebranded Bell Media.

On June 21, 2016, it was announced that Stingray Digital would acquire MuchVibe, MuchLoud, MuchRetro, and Juicebox from Bell Media, at a price-tag later revealed to be $4 million for all 4 channels. The deal for MuchVibe would later close in August 2016 with MuchVibe being rebranded Stingray Vibe on August 12, 2016. On June 1, 2017, Stingray announced the completion of the rebranding process for all 4 channels, which included new programming and a national promotional campaign. With the rebrand, all non-music video programming was removed from the channel.

Programming
Club Bangerz
Daily Video Mix
Go With the Flow
Old School Weekend
Rap @ 11
Stingray Vibe Top 15

Former Programming (as MuchVibe)
The DownLo
PunchMuch
RapCity
Vibe
Vibe 2 Vibe
VibeRated
VintageVibeVideo

References

External links
 Official site
Channel description

V
Commercial-free television networks
Music video networks in Canada
Television channels and stations established in 2001
Digital cable television networks in Canada
English-language television stations in Canada